Kroměříž is a town in the Zlín Region of the Czech Republic. It has about 28,000 inhabitants. It is known for the Kroměříž Castle with castle gardens, which are a UNESCO World Heritage Site. The town centre with the castle complex is well preserved and is protected by law as an urban monument reservation.

Administrative parts
Villages of Bílany, Drahlov, Hradisko, Kotojedy, Postoupky, Těšnovice, Trávník, Vážany and Zlámanka are administrative parts of Kroměříž.

Geography
About two thirds of the municipal territory lies in the Litenčice Hills, eastern part lies in the Upper Morava Valley. A small southern part extends into the Chřiby mountain range. The town is situated on both banks of the Morava River.

History

The first written mention of Kroměříž (under its Latin name Cromezir) is in a document written between 1107 and 1125, when the settlement was bought by Olomouc bishop Jan II. Some sources cite a deed of another Olomouc bishop Jindřich Zdík from 1141 as the first unquestionable written mention of Kroměříž. In the Middle Ages, it was a market village on the crossroads of the Amber and Salt roads. It was located at a ford across the Morava where the toll was collected.

In the 13th century, Kroměříž became the centre of dominion owned by Olomouc bishopric. The Knights Hospitaller settled here and had built a church and a commandery in 1238. In 1241 and 1253, Kroměříž was looted by raids by the Tatars, Cumans and Hungarians. The settlement depopulated and had to be colonized. Kroměříž is last referred to as a market village in a document by Ottokar II of Bohemia from 1256. After 1256, the Olomouc bishop Bruno von Schauenburg came to power over Kroměříž. He took care of it and fundamentally contributed to its development. He founded the market square on the hill above the original settlement and had surrounded it with walls. He also had the Church of Saint Maurice built and had vineyards planted around the settlement. In 1266, Kroměříž was first referred to as a town.

In 1322, Jews were allowed to settle in the town. In the mid-16th century, the Kroměříž Jewish community was the largest serf Jewish community in Moravia. The bishops protected the community for the income flowing from it.

During the rule of bishop Stanislav I Thurzo, the local bishop's residence was repaired and rebuilt into a late Gothic and Renaissance castle. His followers further refined the town and provided costly building repairs.

The town and the castle were badly damaged in the Thirty Years' War. It was plundered by Swedish troops under command of Lennart Torstensson in 1643. Most of the buildings were burned down. The town was further damaged by a large fire in 1656. Kroměříž recovered during the rule of Bishop Karl II von Liechtenstein-Kastelkorn, who had rebuilt the town and the castle. The castle was first repaired, and in 1686 completely rebuilt. He also has repaired town walls, and founded a mint and representative gardens in 1666–1675. Kroměříž again became an important town.

The Constitutive Imperial Congress sat in Kroměříž in 1848. In August 1885 a meeting took place here between the Austrian and the Russian emperors.

Demographics

Economy
On the outskirts of the town there is the Agricultural Research Institute Kroměříž (formerly the Research Institute of Grain, etc., founded in 1951), which is engaged in research and breeding of cereals.

There is a hospital and a psychiatric hospital in Kroměříž. Both are among the main employers in the town.

Transport
The D1 motorway passes through the northern part of the town.

Culture

Kroměříž lies in the ethnographic region of Haná. It has rich cultural life for which it earned a nickname "Athens of Haná". The town has traditionally held an international festival of military brass music and the international festival of sacred music FORFEST.

The Castle Gallery has collection of about 500 paintings and is among the most significant in Europe. It includes Flaying of Marsyas, a late painting by Titian.

Sport
The football club SK Hanácká Slavia Kroměříž plays in the Moravian-Silesian Football League, the third tier of football in the Czech Republic.

Sights

The town is best known for the Baroque Kroměříž Castle with its valuable gardens. The polygonal tower of the castle is the main landmark as well as the oldest remnant of the old Bishop's Castle. The Gardens and Castle at Kroměříž were added to the list of UNESCO World Heritage Sites in 1998.

Despite several reconstructions after the war damage, the Church of Saint Maurice retained its early Gothic appearance. Bishop Bruno von Schauenburg is buried in the church. 

The Church of the Assumption of the Virgin Mary was the oldest church in the town. The original church from the 13th century was destroyed in the Thirty Years' War. The current structure was built in the late Baroque style the first half of the 18th century. It has preserved bell tower from the 13th century. 

The town's main museum is Kroměříž Region Museum. There is also Karel Kryl's exposition on life and work of one of the most famous natives. In the former Bishop's Mint from 1665 is a mint exposition.

In popular culture
In Kroměříž Castle were filmed some scenes from Amadeus (1984), Immortal Beloved (1994), Četnické humoresky (1997), A Royal Affair (2012), Angélique (2013), The Musketeers (2015), and Maria Theresia (2017). Other films shot in the town include The Ear (1970) and Requiem pro panenku (1992).

Notable people

Jan Milíč (1320/1325–1374), ideal predecessor of Jan Hus
Pavel Josef Vejvanovský (1633/1640–1693), baroque composer
Heinrich Ignaz Franz Biber (1644–1704), composer and violinist
Edmund Pascha (1714–1772), preacher, organist and composer
Karel Josef Adolf (1715–1771), painter and restorer
Václav Jan Frierenberger (1759–1823), general of the Napoleonic Wars
Ferdinand Stoliczka (1838–1874), traveler, geologist and naturalist
Max Švabinský (1873–1962), painter
Václav Talich (1883–1961), conductor
Jan Rypka (1886–1968), orientalist and translator
Robert Land (1887–1942), film director 
Augustin Krist (1894–1964), football referee
Martin Miller (1899–1969), actor
Josef Silný (1902–1981), footballer
Alexej Čepička (1910–1990), communist politician
Jaroslav Koutecký (1922–2005), chemist
Karel Prager (1923–2001), architect  
Miloš Macourek (1926–2002), poet, playwright and screenwriter
Milan Pitlach (1943–2021), architect and photographer
Karel Kryl (1944–1994), musician
Boris Krajný (born 1944), pianist
Josef Stejskal (born 1945), poet and surrealist
Petr Uličný (born 1950), footballer and football manager
Michal Peprník (born 1960), professor of American literature
Pavel Štercl (born 1966), slalom canoeist
Petr Štercl (born 1966), slalom canoeist
Pavel Hapal (born 1969), footballer and football manager
Pavel Novotný (born 1973), footballer
Renata Berková (born 1975), triathlete
Andrea Kalivodová (born 1977), opera singer
Rytmus (born 1977), Slovak rapper
Tomáš Břečka (born 1994), footballer
Filip Chytil (born 1999), ice hockey player

Twin towns – sister cities

Kroměříž is twinned with:
 Châteaudun, France
 Nitra, Slovakia
 Krems an der Donau, Austria
 Piekary Śląskie, Poland
 Râmnicu Vâlcea, Romania
 Ružomberok, Slovakia

References

External links

Official tourist portal 
VisitKroměříž – unofficial tourist guide
Photos of Kroměříž and background information
Virtual tour of Kroměříž
UNESCO listing for Kroměříž

 
Cities and towns in the Czech Republic
Populated places in Kroměříž District